Macworld is a website dedicated to products and software of Apple Inc., published by Foundry, a subsidiary of IDG Inc. It started life as a print magazine in 1984 and had the largest audited circulation (both total and newsstand) of Macintosh-focused magazines in North America, more than double its nearest competitor, MacLife (formerly MacAddict). Macworld was founded by David Bunnell and Cheryl Woodard (publishers) and Andrew Fluegelman (editor).  It was the oldest Macintosh magazine still in publication, until September 10, 2014, when IDG, its parent company, announced it was discontinuing the print edition and laid off most of the staff, while continuing an online version.

History of Macworld
In 1997, the publication was renamed Macworld, incorporating MacUser (a name reflected subtly on the magazine's Table of Contents page) to reflect the consolidation of the Ziff-Davis-owned MacUser magazine into the International Data Group-owned Macworld within the new Mac Publishing joint venture between the two publishers. In 1999, the combined company also purchased the online publication MacCentral Online, because Macworld didn't have a powerful online news component at the time. In late 2001 International Data Group (IDG) bought out Ziff-Davis' share of Mac Publishing, making it a wholly owned subsidiary of IDG.

The magazine was published in many countries, either by other IDG subsidiaries or by outside publishers who have licensed the brand name and its content. These editions included Australia, Germany (1990-2015 Macwelt), Italy, Spain, Sweden (MacWorld), Turkey, the United Kingdom, the Netherlands and Indonesia. Its content was also incorporated into a number of other IDG publications. In France, IDG bought Golden magazine, released in 1991, renamed it into Macworld France in 1996. Two years later, it has been merged with Univers Mac and renamed Univers Macworld. Publication ended probably in 2004.

At one time, the magazine's publisher licensed its name to another IDG subsidiary, IDG World Expo, for the Macworld Conference & Expo (later Macworld/iWorld), which took place every January at the Moscone Convention Center in San Francisco.

Macworld has also published in Indonesia by Megindo Tunggal Sejahtera, between 2008 until December 2011.

Podcast
The Macworld Podcast is a weekly podcast published by Macworld. The Macworld Podcast began life on April 26, 2005 as the "Geek Factor Podcast," hosted by Cyrus Farivar, but was upgraded into the official "Macworld Podcast" with its fifth installment in August 2005. It was hosted at various times by Chris Breen, Philip Michaels, Serenity Caldwell, Glenn Fleishman, and Susie Ochs. Following a hiatus in 2017, today the Macworld Podcast is manned by Michael Simon, Roman Loyola and Jason Cross.

See also 
 Macworld Australia

References

External links 
 Macworld (US)
 Macworld UK
 Naya Magazine
 Roku Channels
 Archived Macworld magazines on the Internet Archive

1984 establishments in California
2014 disestablishments in California
Monthly magazines published in the United States
Computer magazines published in the United Kingdom
Defunct computer magazines published in the United States
Computer magazines published in Germany
International Data Group
Magazines published in Indonesia
Computer magazines published in Italy
Macintosh magazines
Magazines established in 1984
Magazines disestablished in 2014
Magazines published in San Francisco
Online magazines with defunct print editions
Computer magazines published in Australia
Computer magazines published in Spain
Computer magazines published in Sweden